This is a list of animated television series first aired prior to 1960.

1948–1952

1953–1958

1959

References

1940s animated television series
1950s animated television series
 1940s
Animated series
Animated series